Oppama may refer to:

Oppama, a location in Yokosuka, Kanagawa Prefecture, Japan
Oppama Station, a train station on the Keikyū Main Line in Japan
Oppama Base or Oppama Test Facility, a fictional location in the anime series Sky Girls
Masato Oppama, a fictional character from the anime series Animation Runner Kuromi
Seawise Giant (1974–2010), the largest ship in the world, was originally named Oppama

See also
Obama (disambiguation)